Mamita dance is a dance of Tripura, India. It is performed at the Mamita Festival, the harvest festival of the Tripuri people.

References

Dances of Tripura